Karl Hirn (1872–1907) was a Finnish botanist, specialized in freshwater algae. He was also a high school teacher.

References 

1872 births
1907 deaths